The Whisperers: Private Life in Stalin's Russia is a history of private life in the Soviet Union during Stalinism, written by Orlando Figes. It was published in 2007 by Metropolitan Books and as an audiobook in 2018 by Audible Studios.

Synopsis
The Whisperers is a social history of everyday private life in the Soviet Union during the era of Stalinism. The book begins with a background of the Russian Revolution and ends with the death of Stalin. According to Figes,

Many books describe the externals of the Terror – the arrests and trials, enslavements and killings of the Gulag – but The Whisperers is the first to explore in depth its influence on personal and family life. How did Soviet people live their private lives in the years of Stalin’s rule? What did they really think and feel? What sort of private life was possible in the cramped communal apartments, where the vast majority of the urban population lived, where rooms were shared by a whole family and often more than one, and every conversation could be overheard in the next room? What did private life mean when the state touched almost every aspect of it through legislation, surveillance and ideological control?

As the statement reveals, the book is mainly focused on life during Stalinist urbanization and industrialization in the 1930s and how this affected the private lives of average Soviet citizens. The author seeks to reveal how individuals lived their private lives, how living in the Stalinist system affected thinking and memory, how it influenced the way individuals communicated with others in day to day life and how Stalinism changed the notion of self and family. Figes refers to the moral sphere of the family as he explores how family and internal lives were shaped by personal strategies and choices to survive difficult and often dire circumstances.

The Whisperers is based on an oral history and archival research project. Together with a team of Russian researchers from Memorial, Figes collected over 250 extensive interviews, along with letters, personal papers, memoirs, diaries, photographs, and physical artifacts "illuminating the inner world of ordinary Soviet citizens living under Stalin's tyranny." The title of the work incorporates two meanings of the Russian word for Whisperers; one meaning to speak softly and quietly for fear of being overheard by others, the second meaning individuals who inform or gossip about another, reflecting the atmosphere of fear that enveloped individuals during this era and the role informers played in creating this atmosphere.

Reviews and recognition
Academic journals
 
 
 
 
 
 

Popular media
 

Awards and recognition
 New York Times Notable Book (2007).

Teaching

Release information
 Hardcover: 2007 (First Edition), Metropolitan Books (Macmillian), 740pp. .
 Paperback: 2008 (First Edition), Metropolitan Books (Macmillian), 748pp. .
 Audiobook: 2018, Narrated by John Telfer, Audible Studios, 29hoursand47minutes.

Similar or related works
 Everyday Stalinism by Sheila Fitzpatrick, Oxford University Press (2007).
 Life and Terror in Stalin's Russia by Robert W. Thurston, Yale University Press (1998).

About the author

Orlando Guy Figes is a British historian and author known for his works on Russian, Soviet, and European history. He is professor of history at Birkbeck College, University of London. Figes serves on the editorial board of the journal Russian History, and is a fellow of the Royal Society of Literature.

See also
 Stalinism
 History of the Soviet Union (1927–1953)
 Industrialization in the Soviet Union
 Collectivization in the Soviet Union
 Intensification of the class struggle under socialism

References

Notes

Citations

External links

 Whisperers, Orando Figes, author's official website with archive of interviews and other materials used to write The Whisperers.
 Memorial, International Historical Educational Charitable and Human Rights Society

2007 non-fiction books
20th-century history books
Books about Joseph Stalin
Books about Stalinism
History books about the Soviet Union
Metropolitan Books books
Stalinism
Stalinism-era scholars and writers